Last Autumn's Dream is the third studio album by British band Jade Warrior. The album, released in 1972, yielded two singles, "A Winter's Tale" and "The Demon Trucker".

Last Autumn's Dream was Jade Warrior's first album to feature Tony Duhig's brother, David Duhig, who co-wrote "The Demon Trucker" with the band, as well as playing guitar on the track. David returned for the next two studio albums, and then again in 1984 (Horizen) and 1998 (Eclipse and Fifth Element).

Track listing
All tracks written by Jade Warrior, except where noted.

 "A Winter's Tale" - 5:06
 "Snake" - 2:55
 "Dark River" - 6:26
 "Joanne" - 2:50
 "Obedience" - 3:12
 "Morning Hymn" - 3:36
 "May Queen" - 5:22
 "The Demon Trucker" - 2:34 (Jade Warrior, David Duhig)
 "Lady of the Lake" - 3:17
 "Borne on the Solar Wind" - 3:02

Personnel
 Jon Field - flutes, percussion, piano, acoustic guitar
 Tony Duhig - electric guitars
 Glyn Havard - bass, acoustic guitars, vocals
 Allan Price - drums
 David Duhig - electric guitar on "The Demon Trucker", electric guitar solo on "Snake"

References

1972 albums
Vertigo Records albums
Repertoire Records albums
Jade Warrior (band) albums